In music, imitation is the repetition of a melody in a polyphonic texture shortly after its first appearance in a different voice. The melody may vary through transposition, inversion, or otherwise, but retain its original character. The intervals and rhythms of an imitation may be exact or modified; imitation occurs at varying distances relative to the first occurrence, and phrases may begin with voices in imitation before they freely go their own ways.

Imitation helps provide unity to a composition and is used in forms such as the fugue and canon.

Definitions
When a phrase recurs exactly as before (except perhaps transposed), it is called strict imitation. A round is thus an example of strict imitation. Repetition is defined as the repetition of a phrase or melody often with variations in key, rhythm, and voice.

Different authors define imitation somewhat differently:

The point of imitation, "marks the beginning of a series of imitative entries in a contrapuntal composition." In counterpoint, imitation occurs in a second voice, usually at a different pitch. A short phrase treated imitatively is called an attacco.

Use in various musical styles
In European classical music, imitative writing was featured heavily in the highly polyphonic compositions of the Renaissance and Baroque eras. A more improvisatory form of imitation can be found in Arab and Indian vocal music where the instrumentalist may accompany the vocalist in a vocal improvisation with imitation.

In pop music a much clichéd form of imitation consists of a background choir repeating – usually the last notes – of the lead singer's last line. See: fill (music).

Examples in Classical Music
Imitation featured in both instrumental and vocal music of the Renaissance.  In the following passage from a Ricercar by Andrea Gabrieli, the instruments at first imitate at a distance of two beats.  Towards the end of the episode, bars 11–12, the imitation becomes closer, at a distance of only one beat:
  
The fugues of J.S.Bach contain a variety of examples of imitation.  The fugue in Bb minor BWV 867, from Book 1 of the Well-tempered Clavier opens with a subject that is imitated at the interval of a fifth higher and at a distance of four beats:
 
Later, the theme is imitated through all five parts at the distance of just one beat:
 
This type of closely followed imitation is characteristic of fugues as they build towards a conclusion.  It is known as stretto.

In the minuet of Mozart's Kegelstatt Trio K498, there are intricate passages that gain in interest and coherence through use of imitation.  Starting at bar 76, the clarinet is followed at a distance of three beats by the viola, then by the piano's right hand and finally, the left.  In bars 84–6, the piano creates an even closer chromatic weave, where the imitation is at the distance of only one beat:
 
A more straightforward example of close imitation occurs later in the same movement at bars 94–100.  This is the linking passage that heralds the return of the opening of the Minuet.  The clarinet plays a sustained pedal note while the three lines played by the viola and the pianist's two hands express a single harmony, the dominant seventh (F7), to prepare for the return of the minuet in the key of B flat major, the tonic key:
The whole movement can be heard on:

See also
 Melodic pattern
 Sequence (music)
 Call and response (music)
 Stretto
 Augmentation (music)
 Diminution
 Retrograde (music)

Sources

Polyphonic form
Repetition (music)